The Phonetics Laboratory is the phonetics laboratory at the University of Oxford, England. It is located at 41 Wellington Square, Oxford.

The laboratory focusses on experimental tests of linguistic assumptions and empirical linguistics.  It provides teaching at the undergraduate and graduate level.  Research students in the laboratory are normally reading for a higher degree in Experimental Linguistics, though students from other disciplines touching on the subject of speech are sometimes based in Phonetics.

The Phonetics Laboratory was established in 1980. It occupies the basement of 41 Wellington Square, a mid-Victorian brick building, expanded since.  It has experimental areas (sound-insulated recording booths), and general experimental space.  The lab also supports signal processing research via software, speech corpora, and processor clusters.

Working Papers
The Phonetics Lab has published collections of working papers (ongoing research and research getting ready for peer-reviewed publication) since 1996.   The 2009 Working Papers are titled "Papers in Phonetics and Computational Linguistics."

External links
 Phonetics Laboratory website
 Faculty of Linguistics, Philology and Phonetics
 Staff
 Current Working Papers
 All Working Papers

Departments of the University of Oxford
Phonetics
University and college laboratories in the United Kingdom